Burial Chamber Trio is a drone metal band consisting of American guitarist/bassist Greg Anderson, Hungarian vocalist Attila Csihar and Australian multi-instrumentalist Oren Ambarchi. These three musicians are also performing with Sunn O))).

The band is not to be confused with Gravetemple, which features the same lineup except Greg Anderson; instead, Sunn O)))'s other guitarist, Stephen O'Malley, is in the band.

Burial Chamber released their vinyl-only self-titled album Burial Chamber Trio. A 10-inch picture disc EP, WVRM (from a live performance), was also released through Southern Lord Records.

Discography
 Burial Chamber Trio (full-length, 2007)
 WVRM (live EP, 2007) Limited to 3,000 copies.

References

External links
 Burial Chamber Trio @ Southern Lord Official Website
 Burial Chamber Trio @ Encyclopaedia Metallum

American doom metal musical groups
American musical trios
Drone metal musical groups